Charles Bradley Huff (born February 5, 1979 in Fair Grove, Missouri) is an American former cyclist, who competed professionally between 2006 and 2018 for the ,  and  teams.

Major results

2006
 1st Stage 1 Tour de Normandie
 1st US rider  National Criterium Championships (2nd overall)
2008
 Tour of Hainan
1st Stages 3 & 5
 1st Stage 2 Tour of Elk Grove
2009
 1st Overall Tulsa Tough
1st Stages 1 & 2
 1st Stage 14 International Cycling Classic
2010
 1st Stage 3 Tour of Hainan
 Tulsa Tough
1st Stages 1 & 2
2012
 1st Stage 4 Nature Valley Grand Prix
 2nd Tulsa Tough
2013
 1st Stage 2 Tour of Lawrence
2014
 1st Stage 4 Joe Martin Stage Race
2016
 1st  National Criterium Championships
 1st Prologue Tour de Guadeloupe
 2nd Overall Nature Valley Grand Prix
1st Stage 5

References

External links

1979 births
Living people
American male cyclists
Sportspeople from Missouri
People from Greene County, Missouri